Mannophryne herminae is a species of frog in the family Aromobatidae.

It is endemic to Venezuela.

Its natural habitats are subtropical or tropical moist lowland forests, subtropical or tropical moist montane forests, and rivers.

It is threatened by habitat loss.

The Mannophryne herminae is classified as Near Threatened (NT) on the IUCN Red List.

References

 La Marca, E. & Manzanilla, J. 2004.  Mannophryne herminae.   2006 IUCN Red List of Threatened Species.   Downloaded on 21 July 2007.

herminae
Amphibians of Venezuela
Endemic fauna of Venezuela
Amphibians described in 1893
Taxonomy articles created by Polbot